Twist Around the Clock is an American musical film released in 1961.  It was a remake of Sam Katzman and Robert E. Kent's Rock Around the Clock. Like Rock Around the Clock, which was followed by a sequel titled Don't Knock the Rock, the film was followed by a sequel titled Don't Knock the Twist.

Plot
A struggling manager visiting a hayseed town discovers a new dance craze, the Twist, and hopes to turn it into an overnight nationwide sensation.

Cast
 Chubby Checker as Chubby Checker
 Dion DiMucci as Dion (as Dion)
 Vicki Spencer as Vicki Spencer
 The Marcels as The Marcels
 Cornelius Harp as The Marcels Lead Singer (as The Marcels)
 Fred Johnson as The Marcels Bass Singer (as The Marcels)
 Gene Bricker as The Marcels Singer (as The Marcels)
 Ronald Mundy as The Marcels Singer (as The Marcels)
 Richard Knauss as The Marcels Singer (as The Marcels)
 Allen Johnson as The Marcels Singer (as The Marcels)
 Clay Cole as Clay Cole
 John Cronin as Mitch Mason
 Mary Mitchel as Tina Louden (as Mary Mitchell)
 Maura McGiveney as Debbie Marshall
 Tol Avery as Joe Marshall
 Alvy Moore as Dizzy Bellew
 Lenny Kent as Georgie Clark
 Tom Middleton as Jimmy Cook
 Jeff Malloy as Larry Louden (as Jeff Parker)
 John Bryant as Harry Davis

Production

References

External links
 

1961 films
1961 musical films
Twist (dance)
Columbia Pictures films
Musical film remakes
1960s English-language films
American musical films